Sheryl Crow is an American singer-songwriter. She has released nine studio albums: Tuesday Night Music Club (1993), Sheryl Crow (1996), The Globe Sessions (1998), C'mon, C'mon (2002), Wildflower (2005), Detours (2008), Home for Christmas (2008), 100 Miles from Memphis (2010) and Feels Like Home (2013). Her compilation and specialty albums include Sheryl Crow and Friends: Live from Central Park (1999), The Very Best of Sheryl Crow (2003), Live at Budokan (2003), iTunes Originals – Sheryl Crow (2006) and Hits & Rarities (2007). All of her albums were released through A&M Records, with the exception of C'mon, C'mon and Feels Like Home, which were released through Interscope Records and Warner Bros., respectively. All of Crow's studio albums have reached Top 10 positions on the Billboard 200, three of which reached peak positions of No. 2 (C'mon, C'mon, Wildflower, and Detours). Crow's singles that have charted on the Billboard Hot 100 include "Leaving Las Vegas", "All I Wanna Do", "Strong Enough", "Can't Cry Anymore", "If It Makes You Happy", "Everyday Is a Winding Road", "My Favorite Mistake", "Anything but Down", "Soak Up the Sun", "Steve McQueen", "The First Cut Is the Deepest", "Good Is Good", "Always on Your Side" (with Sting), "Love Is Free", "Easy" and her renditions of Buddy Holly's "Not Fade Away" and Bill Withers' "Lean On Me" (with Kid Rock and Keith Urban).

For her debut album, Crow received five nominations for the Grammy Awards of 1995, winning three awards (Best Female Pop Vocal Performance and Record of the Year for "All I Wanna Do" and Best New Artist). Crow has won a total of 9 Grammy Awards from 32 nominations, and has also been awarded by the American Music Awards, ASCAP Awards, Orville H. Gibson Awards, and People's Choice Awards. Other recognitions include an honorary degree from Southeast Missouri State University and inclusions on music lists created by VH1 and Entertainment Weekly. Overall, Crow has received 16 awards from 51 nominations.

APRA Music Awards
The APRA Awards are annually held by Australasian Performing Right Association (APRA) to honor outstanding music artists and songwriters of the year. 

!Ref.
|-
| 1995
| "All I Wanna Do"
| Most Performed Foreign Work
| 
|

ASCAP Pop Music Awards
The ASCAP Pop Music Awards honors the songwriters and publishers of the most performed pop songs. 

!Ref.
|-
| rowspan=2|1996
| "All I Wanna Do"
| rowspan=2|Most Performed Songs
| 
| rowspan=2|
|-
| "Strong Enough"
|

Academy of Country Music Awards
The Academy of Country Music Awards were first held in 1966, honoring the industry's accomplishments during the previous year. It was the first country music awards program held by a major organization. Nomination categories include male and female vocalists, albums, videos, songs and musicians. Crow has received a total of five nominations, winning one.

American Country Awards
The American Country Awards is an annual country music awards show, entirely voted on by fans online. Created in 2010 by the Fox Network, the awards honor country music artists for singles, albums, music videos and touring categories. Crow has received two nominations.

American Music Awards
The American Music Awards were created by Dick Clark in 1973 to honor popular musicians from various genres of music and to "put audiences in touch with the latest phenomena in American music". Initial nominees are selected from data compiled by the music industry trade publication, Radio & Records and Nielsen SoundScan, an information system that tracks retail music sales. Top nominees are determined from a national sampling of 15,000 people, and a winner is decided by online voting of the American public. Crow has received three awards from three nominations.

Americana Music Honors and Awards
The Americana Music Honors & Awards were established by the Americana Music Association to celebrate the best releases in Americana music. Crow has received one nomination.

ASCAP Pop Music Awards
The American Society of Composers, Authors and Publishers (ASCAP) is a non-profit performance rights organization that protects its members' musical copyrights by monitoring public performances of their music, whether via a broadcast or live performance, and compensating them accordingly. ASCAP honors the year's most performed songs from its members in a series of annual awards shows in several different music categories. Crow has received one award.

BDSCertified Spins Awards

|-
| 2002
| "Soak Up the Sun"
| 100,000 Spins
|

BMI Pop Awards
Broadcast Music, Inc. (BMI) is one of three United States performing rights organizations, along with ASCAP and SESAC. It collects license fees on behalf of songwriters, composers, and music publishers and distributes them as royalties to those members whose works have been performed.

|-
| rowspan=3|1996
| Sheryl Crow
| Songwriter of the Year 
| 
|-
| "All I Wanna Do"
| rowspan=4|Award-Winning Song
| 
|-
| "Strong Enough"
| 
|-
| 2003
| "Soak Up the Sun"
| 
|-
| 2007
| "Good Is Good"
|

Billboard Music Awards
The Billboard Music Awards are sponsored by Billboard magazine to honor artists based on Billboard Year-End Charts. The award ceremony was held from 1990 to 2007, until its reintroduction in 2011. Before and after that time span, winners have been announced by Billboard, both in the press and as part of their year-end issue.

|-
| rowspan=4|1994
| rowspan=7|Sheryl Crow
|Top Billboard 200 Artist – Female
| 
|-
| Top Hot 100 Artist – Female
| 
|-
| Top Pop Artist
| 
|-
| rowspan=2|Top Pop Artist – Female 
| 
|-
| rowspan=2|1997
| 
|-
| rowspan=2|Top Adult Top 40 Artist
| 
|-
| rowspan=2|2002
| 
|-
| "Soak Up the Sun"
| Top Adult Top 40 Track
| 
|-
| rowspan=5|2004
| rowspan=3|Sheryl Crow
| Top Pop Artist – Female
| 
|-
| Top Billboard 200 Artist – Female
| 
|-
| Top Adult Contemporary Artist
| 
|-
| The Very Best of Sheryl Crow
| Top Internet Album
| 
|-
| "The First Cut Is the Deepest"
| Top Adult Contemporary Track
|

BRIT Awards
The BRIT Awards are the British Phonographic Industry's (BPI) annual pop music awards. Crow has received one award from two nominations.

CMT Music Awards
The CMT Music Awards is a fan-voted awards show for country music videos and television performances. The awards ceremony is held every year in Nashville, Tennessee, and broadcast live on CMT. Voting takes place on CMT's website, CMT.com. Crow has received four nominations.

California Music Awards
The California Music Awards is a music and entertainment ceremony founded by BAM.

|-
| 2000
| Sheryl Crow
| Outstanding Female Vocalist 
|

Country Music Association Awards
The Country Music Association Awards are held annually by the Country Music Association and celebrate excellence and achievements in the country genre. Crow has received three nominations.

|-
|2003
|"Picture" (with Kid Rock)
|Vocal Event of the Year
|
|-
|2006
|"Building Bridges" (with Brooks & Dunn and Vince Gill)
|rowspan=2|Musical Event of the Year
|
|-
|2011
|"Coal Miner's Daughter" (with Loretta Lynn and Miranda Lambert)
|

Daytime Emmy Awards
The Daytime Emmy Awards are awards presented by the New York–based National Academy of Television Arts and Sciences and the Los Angeles–based Academy of Television Arts & Sciences in recognition of excellence in American daytime television programming. Crow has received one nomination in the category "Outstanding Original Song".

Denmark GAFFA Awards
Delivered since 1991. The GAFFA Awards (Danish: GAFFA Prisen) are a Danish award that rewards popular music awarded by the magazine of the same name.

|-
| 1999
| Herself
| Best Foreign Female Act
|

ECHO Awards

The ECHO Award is a German music award granted every year by the Deutsche Phono-Akademie, an association of recording companies.

|-
| 1995
| Herself
| Best International Female 
|

Golden Globes Awards
The Golden Globe Awards are presented annually by the Hollywood Foreign Press Association (HFPA) to recognize outstanding achievements in the entertainment industry, both domestic and foreign, and to focus wide public attention upon the best in film and television. The formal ceremony and dinner at which the awards are presented is a major part of the film industry's awards season, which culminates each year with the Academy Awards. Crow has been nominated twice.

Grammy Awards
The Grammy Awards are awarded annually by the National Academy of Recording Arts and Sciences of the United States for outstanding achievements in the music industry. Often considered the highest music honor, the awards were established in 1958. Crow has been nominated across three separate musical genres (pop, rock and country) and has received 9 awards from 32 nominations.

Groovevolt Music and Fashion Awards

|-
| 2005
| "The First Cut Is the Deepest"
| Best Pop Song Performance – Female
|

Hollywood Music in Media Awards
The Hollywood Music in Media Awards (HMMA) recognizes and honors the music of visual mediums (films, TV, movie trailers, video games, commercials, etc.). 

|- 
| 2016
| "Dancing with Your Shadow" 
| Song – Featured Film
|

MTV Video Music Awards
Originally beginning as an alternative to the Grammy Awards, the MTV Video Music Awards were established in the end of the summer of 1984 by MTV to celebrate the top music videos of the year. Crow has been nominated once.

NME Awards
The NME Awards are annual music awards show founded by the music magazine NME. 
{| class="wikitable"
|-
!Year
!width="250"|Nominated work
!width="350"|Award
!width="65"|Result
!Ref.
|-
| align="center"|1997
| rowspan=2|Herself
| rowspan=2|Best Solo Artist
| 
| align="center"|
|-
| align="center"|1998
| 
| align="center"|

Orville H. Gibson Awards
The Orville H. Gibson Awards, named after the luthier who founded the Gibson Guitar Corporation, recognize guitar players for their artistic accomplishments and to "honor musicians who reflect the spirit of Orville H. Gibson and his belief in quality, prestige and innovation". Award nominees are chosen by a panel of editors from guitar magazines, with winners determined by music critics from around the United States. Crow has received one award from four nominations.

People's Choice Awards
The People's Choice Awards were created in 1975 by producer Bob Stivers to recognize America's favorite film, movie, television and pop culture stars. In the past, the People's Choice Awards were based on Gallup polls, though online voting has decided the winners the past few years. Crow has received one award from three nominations.

Pollstar Concert Industry Awards
The Pollstar Concert Industry Awards aim to reward the best in the business of shows and concerts. 

|-
| rowspan=2|1995
| Herself
| Best New Rock Artist Tour 
| 
|-
| Tour 
| Club Tour of the Year 
| 
|-
| 2007
| Tour (w/John Mayer)
| Most Creative Tour Package
|

Pop Awards
Pop Magazine is an online music magazine created by Hotspot Entertainment and published by A-Z Publishings. The magazine was launched on April 24, 2014. In 2018, Pop Magazine launched the first annual Pop Awards with 25 nominees across 5 categories.

|-
| 2020
| Herself
| Lifetime Achievement Award
|

Teen Choice Awards
The Teen Choice Awards were established in 1999 to honor the year's biggest achievements in music, movies, sports and television, being voted by young people aged between 13 and 19. Sheryl Crow has been nominated three times.

|-
| 2002
| "Soak Up the Sun"
| Choice Summer Song
| 
|-
| rowspan="2" | 2003
| rowspan="2" | "Picture" (feat. Kid Rock)
| Choice Music: Love Song
| 
|-
| Choice Music: Hook Up
|

VH1 Big in 2002 Awards
The VH1's Big in 2002 Awards was an award show that aired on VH1 in the United States. It is the annual VH1's Big in... Awards.

|-
| rowspan=2|2002
| C'mon, C'mon
| Hit Me Baby One More Time 
| 
|-
| "Soak Up the Sun"
| Can't Get You Out of My Head
|

Žebřík Music Awards

!Ref.
|-
| 1996
| rowspan=4|Herself
| rowspan=4|Best International Female
| 
| 
|-
| 1997
| 
| rowspan=3|
|-
| 1998
| 
|-
| 1999
|

Other recognitions
1999 – Crow ranked No. 45 on VH1's 100 Greatest Women of Rock & Roll
2001 – Crow received an honorary degree during the commencement ceremony at Southeast Missouri State University
2002 – Crow ranked No. 41 on VH1's 100 Sexiest Artists
2003 – VH1's 100 Best Songs of the Past 25 Years included "All I Wanna Do" at No. 56
2008 – Entertainment Weekly'''s "100 Best Albums of the Last 25 Years" included Sheryl Crow at No. 39
2012 – Crow ranked No. 25 on VH1's 100 Greatest Women in Music2013 – VH1's 100 Greatest Songs of the '90s included "All I Wanna Do" at No. 61
2013 – Crow ranked No. 85 on VH1's 100 Sexiest Artists2013 – Billboard ranked Crow No. 44 on Top Country Artists''

References

External links
 Official site

Crow, Sheryl
Awards